Kogarikha is a rural locality (a village) in Azletskoye Rural Settlement, Kharovsky District, Vologda Oblast, Russia. The population was 30 as of 2002.

Geography 
Kogarikha is located 53 km northwest of Kharovsk (the district's administrative centre) by road. Popovka is the nearest rural locality.

References 

Rural localities in Kharovsky District